Sir John Clinton, 6th Baron Clinton (c. 1429 –  29 February 1488), of Maxstoke, was an English peer.

Biography
John Clinton was born about 1429. He was the son of John de Clinton, 5th Baron Clinton (1410–1464) and Joan Ferrers.

In 1471 his titles, of barons Clinton and Say, were recognised after he had succeeded to them 24 September 1464, however he was never called to Parliament under either title. He died on 29 February 1488.  He was buried at Greyfriars, London.

Family
Sir John Clinton married twice.  His first wife was Elizabeth Fiennes, Lady Clinton (born c.1455), daughter of Sir Richard Fiennes, 7th Baron Dacre and Joan Dacre, 7th Baroness Dacre, whom he married in about 1463 at Herstmonceux, Sussex.  They had one son, John Clinton, 7th Baron Clinton, born in 1471 in Folkestone, Kent, who died on 4 June 1514.

His second wife was Anne Stafford, daughter of Sir Humphrey Stafford.

Notes

References
 endnotes:

15th-century English nobility
Barons Clinton
1420s births
1488 deaths